Bhavai is a 2021 Indian Hindi-language romance film written and directed by Hardik Gajjar and produced by Dhaval Jayantilal Gada, Aksshay Jayantilal Gada, Parth Gajjar, Richa Amod Sachan and Hardik Gajjar. The dialogues are written by Shreyes Anil Lowlekar. Produced under the banners of Hardik Gajjar Films, Backbencher Pictures and bankrolled by Jayantilal Gada, the film features Pratik Gandhi and Aindrita Ray in the lead roles. The film was released theatrically on 22 October 2021.

Synopsis

Bhavai, also known as Vesha or Swang, is a popular folk theatre form of western India, especially in Gujarat.  

The film is set against the backdrop of folk art form Bhavai. Basically a dramatic entertainer, it tells the story of two lovers in the village of Khakhar, where they are portraying two characters in Ramlila.

Cast 
 Pratik Gandhi as Raja Ram Joshi
 Aindrita Ray as Rani
 Flora Saini as Urmi
 Rajendra Gupta as Panditji
 Rajesh Sharma as Bajrangi
 Abhimanyu Singh as Bhawar
 Ankur Vikal as Bhurelal
 Ankur Bhatia as Lachhu
 Gopal K. Singh as Ratan Singh
 Anil Rastogi as  Netaji 
 Krishna Bisht as Gomu
 Bhagyashree Mote as Pyari

Production
The film was shot in the village of Kutch Nani-Khakhar and Rann of Kutch in June 2018. Initially titled as Ravaan Leela, the title was changed to Bhavai in September 2021 following "audience outrage".

Release
The film was theatrically released on 22 October 2021.

Soundtrack

The soundtrack of the film was composed and lyrics written by Shabbir Ahmed and folk Ramayan part of film is composed by Aanand Shandilyaa.

Reception
Hiren Kotwani writing for The Times of India rated the film with 3.5 stars out of 5. Praising the performance of Pratik Gandhi he wrote, "[he] delivers a wonderful performance as Raja Ram [and] convincingly portrays the conflict and the myriad emotions of his character". Appreciating the cinematography of Chirantan Das, he stated, "cinematography is beautiful, pleasing to the eyes and enhances the scenes." Kotwani liked the music and said, "Shabbir Ahmed’s wonderful soundtrack inspired by Gujarati folk music, adds to the narrative." Concluding he opined, "Bhavai also has some old-world charm: ... the treatment of opening credits with a golden touch to the black-and-white animation and ear-pleasing classical score." Jai Arjun Singh reviewing for Firstpost gave the film 2.5 stars out of 5 and wrote, "Bhavai is a determinedly inoffensive work, almost to the point of being a soporific – and as harmless as a Kumbhkarna who has just swallowed that soporific."  For The Indian Express, Shubhra Gupta gave the film 1.5 stars out of 5 and stated, "[The film] should have been an entertaining, thought-provoking watch, especially because it is done in the colourful folksy Bhavai style." Gupta further added, "But the whole thing is so dated, with everyone being made to declaim loudly, that the tone the film wishes to achieve gets lost." Joginder Tuteja of Rediff rated it 3 out of 5. He praised the performances but criticised the length and narrative.

References

External links 
 
 

2021 films
2020s Hindi-language films
Indian romance films
Films set in Gujarat
Films shot in Gujarat